The Environmental Law Institute (ELI) is a non-profit, non-partisan organization, headquartered in Washington, D.C., that seeks to "make law work for people, places, and the planet" through its work as an environmental law educator, convener, publisher, and research engine. ELI's primary audience includes legal practitioners, business leaders, land managers, land use planners, environmentalists, journalists, and lawmakers. The Institute also convenes conferences to promote the exchange of ideas; holds seminars to educate legal practitioners and business leaders; and publishes original research, both as monographs and in its periodicals, the Environmental Law Reporter and The Environmental Forum.

Structure
Research & Policy staff:  A portion of ELI’s researchers are attorneys with specialties in various aspects of environmental law.  Other researchers include scientists, policy analysts, and visiting scholars from outside the United States.

Associates:  The ELI Associates Program offers networking and education opportunities for current and future leaders in the environmental law and policy profession. Members from all sectors gain access to basic training through ELI’s "boot camps", analysis of issues in ELI’s policy and law journals and its website, seminars with experts debating pressing topics from diverse perspectives, and opportunities to connect with public officials, colleagues, and peers at events such as the annual ELI Award Dinner. The program offers members benefits and contacts.

ELI associates pay an annual subscription fee. Unlike other member-based organizations, ELI does not represent its associates or try to promote their activities. Associates receive ELI’s major publications at free or discounted prices, and their employees attend ELI’s educational seminars, such as its boot camps on environmental law, free of charge.

Board: A board of directors provides oversight to the Institute. The board members are leaders from federal and state government, industry, the private bar, citizen organizations, and academia.

Funding: Most of ELI’s funding comes from project-specific grants from major organizations, foundations, and government agencies.

Major research areas
ELI’s research is organized into six major areas: climate and energy; international programs; environmental governance; environmental health; land and biodiversity; and freshwater and ocean resources.  Under each of these six umbrellas are the research programs, most of which are managed independently of other programs.  For example, under Water Resources there are programs addressing oceans, wetlands, international waters, and water quality.  Within the Oceans Program are publications on sustainable fisheries; conferences to develop laws that foster ecosystem-based management; and continuing legal education seminars on issues ranging from ocean-based shipping to the potential for wave-generated electricity.  Each of the six major program areas is this diverse, and most of the research done by ELI has such a focus on single issues.  ELI typically publishes the results of its research in research reports.

Publications

Research Publications 
Most of the work done by the ELI research and policy staff becomes reports that are produced in-house and published electronically.  ELI makes these reports available, usually free of charge, on their website.

Periodicals
Other periodicals by ELI are available via subscription (The Environmental Law Reporter) or membership (The Environmental Forum).
 The Environmental Law Reporter's (ELR's) News & Analysis is the Institute’s flagship publication, with its first issue appearing in January 1971 shortly after the founding of ELI. Publishing submissions from academic and practicing attorneys, the journal’s authors review court cases, laws, legal trends, and agency actions.  Articles address topics in state and federal law.  ELR News & Analysis is issued 12 times per year and has a circulation of 850 organizational subscribers. ELR also produces Weekly Update, Daily Update, available online and on its website. ELR also has a vast collection of court decisions, congressional materials, agency guidance documents, and other information useful to the environmental practitioner. ELR's collection goes back to 1969. It is a subscription-based service, but many items can be accessed for free.
 The Environmental Forum (TEF) is ELI’s non-technical publication, founded in 1982.  Like ELR's journal, News & Analysis, it publishes articles primarily written by authors outside ELI’s research staff.  Unlike 'News & Analysis', however, TEF is written for a general audience.  It keeps its readership abreast of developments in environmentalism, particularly with respect to legislation and enforcement.  TEF is available only to ELI Associates as a membership benefit and is not a subscription item. It comes out bimonthly to a circulation of 3500.
 The Journal of Energy and Environmental Law (JEEL) is a student run journal published by The George Washington University Law School in cooperation with ELI. Issued three times a year as a supplement to ELI’s Environmental Law Reporter (ELR) News & Analysis, the first edition was released in July 2010, with the subsequent edition to appear in January 2011. The annual subscription rate is US$30. The journal will focus on both energy-related and environment-related legal and policy issues and their intersections. It is particularly interested in articles addressing international treaties, legislative initiatives in other countries, U.S. federal and state legislation, and case law developments dealing with issues.
 The National Wetlands Newsletter''' (NWN), the Institute’s journal on wetlands law and policy, was discontinued in 2016. The bimonthly newsletter had been published since 1979.  It covered wetland regulation, policy, science, and management, and included articles written by outside wetland professionals and academics as well as news items contributed by the editorial staff.  Archived materials are accessible to past NWN subscribers and ELI members.

Books

ELI Press publishes books by outside authors. Over the years, some of the most popular publications have been The Practical Guide to Environmental Management, now in its 11th edition, and The Environmental Law Deskbook'', now in its eighth edition. The latter is one of dozens of types of Deskbooks that ELI has produced.

References

Environmental policies organizations